Balcanoona is a small human settlement in the Vulkathunha-Gammon Ranges of South Australia. The population is approximately 10-30 people.

References 

Populated places in South Australia